The Grom-Bach is a small river of Hesse, Germany.

The Grom-Bach flows into the Ohebach in Frielendorf. Shortly before the village of Todenhausen, the Grom-bach turns into an easterly direction, then into a southerly direction to flow to Spieskappel. Before the Grom-Bach reaches Spieskappel, it turns again to the north-east and immediately after passing under the federal highway , it merges with the approaching Hohlenbach coming from the south.

External links
WRRL in Hessen - Übersicht Oberflächenwasserkörper Grom-Bach (obere Efze)
Gewässerkartendienst des Hessischen Ministeriums für Umwelt, Klimaschutz, Landwirtschaft und Verbraucherschutz

See also
List of rivers of Hesse

Rivers of Hesse
Rivers of Germany